Boxer is a surname. Notable people with the surname include:

Alan Boxer (1916–1998), Air Vice-Marshal of the Royal Air Force
Amanda Boxer (born 1948), British actress
Barbara Boxer (born 1940), American senator
C. R. Boxer (1904–2000), British historian
Christina Boxer (born 1957), English middle-distance runner
Edward Boxer (1784–1855), British naval officer
Edward Mounier Boxer (1822–1898), British inventor and army officer
Herb Boxer (born 1947), former American ice-hockey player
John Boxer (born 1964), Australian actor
Mark Boxer (1931–1988), British magazine editor
Matthew Boxer, New Jersey State Comptroller
Stephen Boxer (born 1948), British actor
Steven G. Boxer, American chemist